Caleb Jay Jones (born June 6, 1997) is an American professional ice hockey defenseman for the Chicago Blackhawks of the National Hockey League (NHL). His older brother, also a defenseman, is Seth Jones. His father is former NBA player Popeye Jones.

Playing career
Jones played junior hockey for the Portland Winterhawks of the Western Hockey League (WHL) and for the United States National Team Development Program in the United States Hockey League (USHL). He was selected in the 2015 NHL Draft in the 4th round by the Edmonton Oilers and signed an entry level contract with them on April 7, 2016.

Jones continued with the Winterhawks for the 2015–16 and 2016–17 seasons, though he did get called up for three games with the Oilers farm team, the Bakersfield Condors of the American Hockey League (AHL), in 2015–16. Jones played the full 2017–18 season with the Condors, returning to their lineup for the 2018–19 season. Jones was called up by the Oilers on December 12, 2018, following an injury to Oscar Klefbom. He made his NHL debut on December 14 against the Philadelphia Flyers.

On July 12, 2021, Jones was traded by the Oilers to the Chicago Blackhawks, along with a conditional third-round pick in 2022, in exchange for Duncan Keith and Tim Söderlund.

Career statistics

Regular season and playoffs

International

References

External links

1997 births
Living people
African-American ice hockey players
American expatriate ice hockey players in Canada
American men's ice hockey defensemen
Bakersfield Condors players
Chicago Blackhawks players
Edmonton Oilers draft picks
Edmonton Oilers players
Ice hockey people from Texas
Portland Winterhawks players
Sportspeople from Arlington, Texas
USA Hockey National Team Development Program players